The Sukhnag River (Koshur:سۄکھٔ ناگ آرٕ)is one of the major tributaries of the River Jhelum located in Budgam District in the Kashmir Valley in the union territory of Jammu and Kashmir, India.

Origin
There are several streams originating at the top of the Tosa Maidan locale, all of which join to form the Sukhnag river. Ahij canal and Lar canal originate from Sukhnag river which irrigate various areas of district Budgam. The river passes through Arizal, Peth Zanigam, Buna Zanigam, Sail,  Beerwah, Rathsun, Pethmakhama, Hanji-Bough, Mazhama, Kawoosa, Narbal, Daslipora, Palhalan Ghat, Nowgam Jheel  villages.

References

Rivers of Jammu and Kashmir